Frederic E. Hammer (April 7, 1909 – September 3, 1980) was an American lawyer and politician from New York.

Life
He was born on April 7, 1909, in New York City. He attended the public schools and graduated from St. John's University.

Hammer was a member of the New York State Senate (5th D.) from 1945 to 1948, sitting in the 165th and 166th New York State Legislatures. In November 1948, he ran for re-election, but was defeated by Democrat James F. Fitzgerald.

He was an alternate delegate to the 1960 and 1964 Republican National Conventions. In September 1960, he was appointed by Governor Nelson Rockefeller to the Workmen's Compensation Board. In November 1963, he ran for D.A. of Queens County, but was defeated by Democrat Frank D. O'Connor.

Hammer was a judge of the New York City Civil Court until 1971, and a justice of the New York Supreme Court (11th D.) from 1972 until his death in 1980.

He died on September 3, 1980, at his home in Neponsit, Queens.

Sources

1909 births
1980 deaths
People from Queens, New York
Republican Party New York (state) state senators
St. John's University (New York City) alumni
New York Supreme Court Justices
20th-century American judges
20th-century American politicians